Hindol is a Vidhan Sabha constituency of Dhenkanal district, Odisha.

Area of this constituency includes Hindol block and Odapada block.

In 2009 election, Biju Janata Dal candidate Anjali Behera defeated Indian National Congress candidate Rebati Behera by a margin of 15,039 votes.

Elected Members

12 elections held during 1951 to 2014 including a by-poll in 1993. Elected members from the Hindol constituency are:
2019: (56): Seemarani Nayak (BJD)
2014: (56): Seemarani Nayak (BJD)
2009: (56): Anjali Behera (BJD)
2004: (117): Anjali Behera (BJD)
2000: (117): Anjali Behera (BJD)
1995: (117): Maheswara Naik (Congress) 
1993: (By-Poll): Patta Nayak (Janata Dal)
1990: (117): Trinath Naik (Janata Dal) 
1985: (117): Rabinarayan Naik (Congress)
1980: (117): Trinath Naik (JNP (SC))
1977: (117): Trinath Naik (Janata Party)
1974: (117): Bhagirathi Naik (Congress)
1951: (14): Arakhita Nayak (Congress)

2019 Election Result

2014 Election Result
In 2014 election, Biju Janata Dal candidate Seemarani Nayak defeated Bharatiya Janata Party candidate Laxmidhar Behera by a margin of 50,499 votes.

Summary of results of the 2009 Election

Notes

References

Assembly constituencies of Odisha
Dhenkanal district